Ruffiac is the name of several communes in France:

Ruffiac, in the Lot-et-Garonne department
Ruffiac, in the Morbihan department

Other uses
Ruffiac (grape), another name for the French wine grape Arrufiac